Eucalyptus molyneuxii is a species of small tree or mallee that is endemic to the Little Desert National Park area of Victoria. It has short-fibrous bark on varying amounts of its trunk and branches, smooth bark above, glossy green, lance-shaped adult leaves, flower buds arranged in groups of between eleven and fifteen, white flowers and cup-shaped or conical fruit.

Description
It has thin, short-fibred grey bark to varying heights of its trunk and branches, smooth, yellowish bark above. Flowering occurs in autumn and the flowers are white.

Taxonomy and naming
Eucalyptus molyneuxii was first formally described in 1999 by Kevin James Rule and the description was published in the journal Muelleria from a specimen collected near the McDonald Highway in the Little Desert National Park. The specific epithet (molyneuxii) honours W.M. ("Bill") Molyneux for his contribution to the understanding of several Victorian plant genera and to conservation activity leading to the establishment of the Little Desert National Park.

Distribution and habitat
This species is only known from about twelve plants in two populations in the Little Desert National Park, growing in deep sand.

Conservation status
This eucalypt is listed as "endangered" under the Victorian Government Flora and Fauna Guarantee Act 1988.

References

Flora of Victoria (Australia)
Trees of Australia
molyneuxii
Myrtales of Australia
Plants described in 1999